is a Japanese actor.

Career
Kora has gained recognition for his roles in films such as Shinji Aoyama's Sad Vacation, Yukio Ninagawa's Snakes and Earrings, Tran Anh Hung's Norwegian Wood, Ryuichi Hiroki's The Egoists, Yoshihiro Fukagawa's Into the White Night, and Koji Wakamatsu's The Millennial Rapture.

Filmography

Film

Television

Awards

References

External links
 Official profile 
 

Japanese male film actors
21st-century Japanese male actors
Actors from Kumamoto Prefecture
Living people
1987 births
Japanese male television actors
People from Kumamoto